T. suis  may refer to:
 Trichuris suis, a worm species used in helminthic therapy
 Trypanosoma suis, a protozoan species that causes one form of the surra disease in pigs

See also
 Suis (disambiguation)